The Flag of Kansas City, or the KC Flag, is a city flag for the City of Kansas City, Missouri. It consists of 2 horizontal bars, red above blue, with a white stylized heart emblem. It is the 7th city flag for Kansas City.

It was designed by Jared Horman. The current flag was adopted by a 10–1 vote by the City Council on February, 9th, 2023.

Past Flags
The first flag of Kansas City, was adopted in 1913. It was pennant shaped. It contained the Seal of Kansas City. The seal featured a shield with the incorporation date of 1850 inside it, and 5 stars on the top of the shield. The Shield was surrounded on the top by a curved Kansas and below by a curved City. That was encircled by a loral, and the words "A Good Place to Live".

The third flag adopted in 1944, was a traditional flag shape. It was a navy and white tricolor, with the updated city seal in the middle. This seal featured the "Scout" statue in silhouette, above a red heart, encircled by the words "Kansas City" and "Missouri" separated by two stars.  The fourth flag was adopted in 1972, and featured the KC Bicentennial Seal or "Paper Clip Seal" on a white field with two vertical bars on the end. In 1992 this version updated the seal to the fountain emblem, and added the words, City of Fountains Heart of the Nation above the emblem. and Kansas City, Missouri below it. Just a few years later, the flag was updated again, to reflect the French Tricolor representing the connection to the French fur traders along the Missouri River.

Gallery

See also
 Flag of St. Louis
 Flag of Missouri
 List of flags by design
 List of U.S. state, district, and territorial insignia

References

 
2023 establishments in Missouri
Missouri
Flag
Missouri